ISBD may stand for:

International Society for Bipolar Disorders, a nonprofit organization for bipolar disorder
International Standard Bibliographic Description